Newbourne Springs is a  biological Site of Special Scientific Interest in Newbourne in Suffolk. It is owned by Anglian Water and managed by the Suffolk Wildlife Trust.

Most of this site is a narrow valley with a fast-flowing stream with alder carr and fen. Drier and more acidic soils have grassland, woodland, scrub and bracken heath. The site is actively managed, producing diverse flora and many breeding and migratory birds such as treecreepers, nuthatches and sedge warblers.

There is access from Woodbridge Road, which goes through the site.

References

Suffolk Wildlife Trust
Sites of Special Scientific Interest in Suffolk